Vallières is an arrondissement in the Nord-Est department of Haiti. As of 2015, the population was 71,851 inhabitants. Postal codes in the Vallières Arrondissement start with the number 24.

The arrondissement consists of the following communes:
 Vallières
 Carice
 Mombin-Crochu

References

Arrondissements of Haiti
Nord-Est (department)